Raúl Valbuena Cano (born 23 April 1975) is a Spanish retired footballer who played as a goalkeeper.

Club career
Born in Madrid, Valbuena made his senior debut with CD Leganés' reserve team, aged only 16. In the 1992 off-season he joined Real Madrid's youth setup, and was promoted to the C-side in 1994.

In 1995, Valbuena was assigned to Real Madrid Castilla in Segunda División. He played his first match as a professional on 24 March 1996, starting in a 1–0 away win against CA Marbella.

Valbuena also suffered relegation in the 1996–97 season, and in summer 1998 he moved to another reserve team, RCD Mallorca B also in the second level. After splitting first-choice duties with Leo Franco, he signed for fellow league club CD Toledo in July 1999.

In 2000, Valbuena joined Albacete Balompié, appearing regularly during his two-year spell. On 6 June 2002 he moved to Real Zaragoza, but only appeared in one league match in an eventual top-flight promotion.

Valbuena made his La Liga debut on 21 September 2003, playing the full 90 minutes in a 0–3 away loss to Real Sociedad. He featured sparingly during the campaign, and was subsequently loaned to former side Albacete on 15 July 2004.

Valbuena was regularly used by the Castile-La Mancha-based team – only being limited due to injuries – which suffered relegation. On 1 May 2005, after starting in a 0–2 defeat at FC Barcelona, he suffered Lionel Messi's first league goal, the second of the match.

Valbuena returned to Zaragoza in 2005, where he notably played 25 minutes in the 2006 Copa del Rey Final 1–4 loss against RCD Espanyol, after replacing field player Delio Toledo due to César Sánchez's dismissal. He left the club the following year, and signed a three-year deal with Alba; he retired with the latter in 2008, at the age of 33.

References

External links

1975 births
Living people
Footballers from Madrid
Spanish footballers
Association football goalkeepers
La Liga players
Segunda División players
Segunda División B players
CD Leganés B players
Real Madrid C footballers
Real Madrid Castilla footballers
RCD Mallorca B players
CD Toledo players
Albacete Balompié players
Real Zaragoza players
Spain youth international footballers
Spanish football managers